Geonoma is a genus of small to medium-sized  palms native to the forest understorey of tropical Central and South America.

This palm genus is one of the largest in the Neotropics. Its 64 species are distributed from Mexico and Haiti in the north to Paraguay in the south; two are found in the Lesser Antilles.

Uses
In South America, the leaves of species such as Geonoma deversa, Geonoma orbignyana, and Geonoma macrostachys are economically important for their use in thatching roofs.

Taxonomy
The genus is a member of the palm tribe Geonomateae (Arecaceae: Arecoideae), an important Neotropical group due to its wide distribution across Central and South America, its diversity and abundance, and the use of a number of species by local human populations. The distribution of the tribe Geonomeae stretches from southeast Mexico down through Central America and into South America, notably Brazil and Bolivia, and species are also found in the Greater and Lesser Antilles. This tribe consists of a group of understory and sub-canopy palms that populate both tropical lowland and montane forests.  While members of this group are relatively easy to collect, as they are not canopy palms or spiny palms, and are well represented in herbaria, the taxonomy and phylogeny of the species within the tribe are still uncertain. The resolution of the tribe has been disputed despite the fact that Geonomateae species are characterized by three morphological synapomorphies: the petals of pistillate flowers are basally connate, the presence of slender and elongate styles, and the flowers are borne in pits in the rachillae.

Species
The following species are currently recognized:

 Geonoma appuniana Spruce
 Geonoma arundinacea Mart.
 Geonoma aspidiifolia Spruce
 Geonoma atrovirens Borchs. & Balslev
 Geonoma baculifera (Poit.) Kunth
 Geonoma brenesii Grayum
 Geonoma brevispatha Barb.Rodr.
 Geonoma brongniartii Mart.
 Geonoma camana Trail
 Geonoma chlamydostachys Galeano-Garcés
 Geonoma chococola Wess.Boer
 Geonoma concinna Burret
 Geonoma congesta H.Wendl. ex Spruce
 Geonoma cuneata H.Wendl. ex Spruce
 Geonoma densa Linden & H.Wendl.
 Geonoma deversa (Poit.) Kunth
 Geonoma divisa H.E.Moore
 Geonoma epetiolata H.E.Moore
 Geonoma ferruginea H.Wendl. ex Spruce
 Geonoma frontinensis
 Geonoma gamiova Barb.Rodr.
 Geonoma gastoniana Glaz. ex Drude
 Geonoma hoffmanniana H.Wendl. ex Spruce
 Geonoma hugonis Grayum & Nevers
 Geonoma interrupta (Ruiz & Pav.) Mart.
 Geonoma irena Borchs.
 Geonoma jussieuana Mart. in A.D.d'Orbigny
 Geonoma laxiflora Mart.
 Geonoma leptospadix Trail
 Geonoma linearis Burret
 Geonoma longipedunculata Burret
 Geonoma longivaginata H.Wendl. ex Spruce
 Geonoma macrostachys Mart.
 Geonoma maxima (Poit.) Mart.
 Geonoma monospatha de Nevers
 Geonoma mooreana de Nevers & Grayum
 Geonoma myriantha Dammer
 Geonoma oldemanii Granv.
 Geonoma oligoclona Trail
 Geonoma orbignyana Mart. in A.D.d'Orbigny
 Geonoma paradoxa Burret
 Geonoma paraguanensis H.Karst.
 Geonoma pauciflora Mart.
 Geonoma poeppigiana Mart. in A.D.d'Orbigny
 Geonoma pohliana Mart.
 Geonoma polyandra Skov
 Geonoma polyneura Burret
 Geonoma rubescens H.Wendl. ex Drude
 Geonoma santanderensis Galeano & R.Bernal
 Geonoma schottiana Mart.
 Geonoma scoparia Grayum & Nevers
 Geonoma seleri Burret
 Geonoma simplicifrons Willd.
 Geonoma spinescens H.Wendl.
 Geonoma stricta (Poit.) Kunth
 Geonoma supracostata Svenning
 Geonoma talamancana Grayum
 Geonoma tenuissima H.E.Moore
 Geonoma triandra (Burret) Wess.Boer
 Geonoma triglochin Burret
 Geonoma trigona (Ruiz & Pav.) A.H.Gentry
 Geonoma umbraculiformis Wess.Boer
 Geonoma undata Klotzsch
 Geonoma weberbaueri Dammer ex Burret
 Geonoma wilsonii Galeano & R.Bernal

References

 
Trees of the Caribbean
Trees of Central America
Trees of South America
Arecaceae genera